Yan Wenjing (October 15, 1915  – July 20, 2005) was a Chinese writer. He was born Yan Wenjin in Wuchang, Hubei province.

Career
 In 1934, Yan Wenjing graduated from Hubei Senior High School.
 In 1935, Yan Wenjing took his first job in Beijing Library.
 In 1937, Yan Wenjing published a collection of his proses.
 In 1938, Yan Wenjing continued his study in Multi-political University.
 a reflection written by Yan Wenjing on the hope for friendly Sino-Japanese relations describing the author's discovery of Lotus flowers imported from China which had been planted around the portrait of Jianzhen in the Tōshōdai-ji temple in Nara, Nara, Japan is included as one of the oral assessment passages on the Putonghua Proficiency Test.

Works
 1943: 《南南和胡子伯伯》
 1949: 《丁丁的一次奇怪旅行》《小溪流的歌》
 1950: 《蚯蚓和蜜蜂的故事》
 1957: 《三只骄傲的小猫》, 《唐小西在下一次开船港》

References

External links
8dou.net
People.com.cn
News.sina.com.cn

1915 births
2005 deaths
Chinese children's writers
Republic of China writers
People's Republic of China writers
Writers from Wuhan
Chinese fiction writers